Heinrich "Heinz" Kwiatkowski (16 July 1926 – 23 May 2008) was a German football goalkeeper. He was born in Gelsenkirchen.

He was a member of the West German team that won the 1954 FIFA World Cup. He also participated in the 1958 FIFA World Cup. In total he earned four caps for West Germany. During his club career he played for FC Schalke 04, Rot-Weiß Essen and Borussia Dortmund. He won the German football championship with Dortmund in 1956 and 1957. He died in Dortmund.

As a goalkeeper, Kwiatkowski's specialty was to fist the ball away, which earned him the nickname "Heini Fausten".

References

1926 births
2008 deaths
Association football goalkeepers
German footballers
Germany international footballers
1954 FIFA World Cup players
1958 FIFA World Cup players
FIFA World Cup-winning players
Borussia Dortmund players
FC Schalke 04 players
German football managers
Borussia Dortmund managers
Bundesliga players
Sportspeople from Gelsenkirchen
People from the Province of Westphalia
Borussia Dortmund II managers
Footballers from North Rhine-Westphalia